Woman's Journal was a monthly British magazine primarily targeted towards women readers, published from November 1927 to 2001. It contained a mix of contemporary fiction, fashion and stories about the Royal family.

It also supported women's many interests, including publishing a Women Driver's Pocketbook in 1963, with useful tips and guidance on safe driving.

Among the writers contributing to its fiction pages were -
Margery Allingham
Leslie Charteris
Agatha Christie
Daphne Du Maurier
John Galsworthy
Fanny Heaslip Lea
Georgette Heyer
Ngaio Marsh
Mary Stewart
Elizabeth Von Armin
H.G.Wells
John Wyndham
Dornford Yates
Woman's Journal has resurrected in the UK as The Women's Journal in 2023. The Women's Journal UK is a new online feminist magazine by women, for women - relaunched to readdress women's issues at a time when there has been many steps backwards for women worldwide.

Editors
Ailsa Garland (1965–1970)
 Marcelle d'Argy Smith (1997–1999) 
 Elsa McAlonan (1999–2001)

References

Monthly magazines published in the United Kingdom
Defunct women's magazines published in the United Kingdom
Magazines established in 1927
Magazines disestablished in 2001